Manuel de Regla Mota y Álvarez (November 21, 1795May 1, 1864) was a Dominican military figure and politician. Mota served as the 5th president of the Dominican Republic from May 26, 1856 until October 8, 1856. Prior to that he served as the country's vice president under Pedro Santana.

Political and military career 
After the Dominican War of Independence, Mota was appointed Colonel of the National Militia. His duties as Colonel were to protect the border between Haiti and the Dominican Republic, which at the time were near San Cristóbal and Baní.

Mota's political and military career was always under the shadow of the caudillo, Pedro Santana. Regla Mota was well liked by Santana and as such Mota served as Santana's Minister of War and Marine Affairs, and as Vice-President.

President 
On March 18, 1844, Haitian forces under the command of General Souffarnt triumphantly fought the Dominican forces lead by then General Mota at the battle of Cabeza de Maria.

In May 1856, then Vice-President Mota assumed the Presidency, after the fallout between Santana and Antonio María de Segovia, the Spanish Consul of the time. Soon after Segovia caused Santana to relinquish his Presidency, he forced out Mota as well, in favor of Buenaventura Báez. The hostility between Segovia and Santana became so great that Santana had to flee. Soon afterwards Mota died, in May 1864.

References 
Biography at the Enciclopedia Virtual Dominicana

|-

|-

1795 births
1864 deaths
19th-century Dominican Republic politicians
People from Peravia Province
Presidents of the Dominican Republic
Vice presidents of the Dominican Republic
Dominican Republic military personnel
White Dominicans